The Last Truck: Closing of a GM Plant is a 2009 documentary film, directed by Steven Bognar and Julia Reichert and produced for HBO Films. The film follows the closure of the Moraine Assembly plant, a General Motors automobile factory in Moraine, Ohio, on December 23, 2008.

Production
Reichert and Bognar spoke to several hundred of the nearly 3,000 workers at the plant who were to lose their jobs as a result of the closure. Lacking access to film inside the plant itself, the filmmakers supplied some of the workers with Flip Video Mino cameras to smuggle into the factory, allowing them to acquire footage of some of the final vehicles being assembled there.

Accolades
The Last Truck was nominated for the Academy Award for Best Documentary (Short Subject) in 2009.

See also
Roger and Me, the 1989 Michael Moore documentary film similar in content
 American Factory, the 2019 documentary by the same filmmakers chronicling the subsequent takeover of the factory by a Chinese magnate

References

External links
HBO website

Trailer

2009 short documentary films
HBO documentary films
Documentary films about the automotive industry
Documentary films about labor relations in the United States
Films shot in Ohio
General Motors
2009 films
Films directed by Steven Bognar and Julia Reichert
Documentary films about Ohio
2000s English-language films
2000s American films
Films about companies
American short documentary films